John Anstruther may refer to:

Sir John Anstruther, 1st Baronet, of Anstruther (c. 1678–1753), Member of Parliament (MP) for Anstruther Easter Burghs 1708–1712 and 1713–1715 and Fife 1715–1741
Sir John Anstruther, 2nd Baronet (1718–1799), MP for Anstruther Easter Burghs 1766–1780 and 1790–1793
John Anstruther (British Army officer) (1736–1815), Scottish lieutenant-colonel
Sir John Anstruther, 4th Baronet and 1st Baronet (1753–1811), MP for Anstruther Burghs 1783–1790, 1796–1797 and 1806–1811, for Cockermouth 1790–1796

See also
John Anstruther-Thomson (1776–1833), Scottish colonel
Sir John Carmichael-Anstruther, 5th Baronet (1785–1818), known as John Anstruther until 1817, MP for Anstruther Easter Burghs 1811–1818
John Anstruther-Thomson of Charleton and Carntyne (1818–1904), Scottish colonel